The 1983 Rhineland-Palatinate state election was conducted on 6 March 1983 to elect members to the Landtag, the state legislature of Rhineland-Palatinate, West Germany.

|-
|colspan=15| 
|-
! style="background-color:#E9E9E9;text-align:left;" width=300px colspan=2|Party
! style="background-color:#E9E9E9;text-align:right;" width=50px |Vote %
! style="background-color:#E9E9E9;text-align:right;" width=50px |Vote % ±
! style="background-color:#E9E9E9;text-align:right;" width=50px |Seats
! style="background-color:#E9E9E9;text-align:right;" width=50px |Seats ±
|-
| width=5px style="background-color: " |
| style="text-align:left;" | Christian Democratic Union
| style="text-align:right;" | 51.9
| style="text-align:right;" | +1.8
| style="text-align:right;" | 57
| style="text-align:right;" | +6
|-
| style="background-color: " |
| style="text-align:left;" | Social Democratic Party
| style="text-align:right;" | 39.6
| style="text-align:right;" | –2.7
| style="text-align:right;" | 43
| style="text-align:right;" | ±0
|-
| style="background-color: " |
| style="text-align:left;" | The Greens
| style="text-align:right;" | 4.5
| style="text-align:right;" | N/A
| style="text-align:right;" | 0
| style="text-align:right;" | N/A
|-
| style="background-color: " |
| style="text-align:left;" | Free Democratic Party
| style="text-align:right;" | 3.5
| style="text-align:right;" | –2.9
| style="text-align:right;" | 0
| style="text-align:right;" | –6
|-
| style="background-color: " |
| style="text-align:left;" | German Communist Party
| style="text-align:right;" | 0.2
| style="text-align:right;" | –0.2
| style="text-align:right;" | 0
| style="text-align:right;" | ±0
|- 
| style="background-color: " |
| style="text-align:left;" | National Democratic Party
| style="text-align:right;" | 0.1
| style="text-align:right;" | –0.6
| style="text-align:right;" | 0
| style="text-align:right;" | ±0
|-
| style="background-color: " |
| style="text-align:left;" | Others
| style="text-align:right;" | 0.1
| style="text-align:right;" | –0.4
| style="text-align:right;" | 0
| style="text-align:right;" | ±0
|- style="background: #E9E9E9"
! style="text-align:left;" colspan=2| Total
| 100.0
| —
| 100
| ±0
|-
| colspan=9 style="text-align:left;" | Source: parties-and-elections.de
|}

1983
1983 elections in Germany